In explosives engineering, brisance is the shattering capability of a high explosive, determined mainly by its detonation pressure.

Practical uses
Brisance is of practical importance for determining the effectiveness of an explosion in fragmenting shells, bomb casings, grenades, structures, and the like. The sand crush test and Trauzl lead block test are commonly used to determine the relative brisance in comparison to TNT (which is considered a standard reference for many purposes).

The value of brisance depends on the application. At one extreme, if an explosive is to be used for propulsion, e.g. by driving a piston or a bullet, brisance is likely to be undesirable, because the objective will be to move the load, not to shatter it or the engine or firearm, nor to produce a loud report. Such propulsive charges are designed to burn controllably, such as carburetted fuel/air mixes in vehicle piston engines, or nitrocellulose fibres or grains of controlled textures in firearm cartridges. 

For certain types of blasting, such as for quarrying slate, in which the objective is to loosen the product from surrounding rock with as little damage as possible, one needs no more brisance than is necessary to split off the desired product profitably, without unacceptable waste. For this purpose blasting powder of low brisance is necessary. 

In shattering hard rock or military defences, brisance generally is necessary, so high explosives with extremely high detonation velocity are used as far as is practical.  

Fragmentation occurs by the action of the transmitted shock wave, the strength of which depends on the detonation pressure of the explosive. Generally, the higher this pressure, the finer the fragments generated. High detonation pressure correlates with high detonation velocity, the speed at which the detonation wave propagates through the explosive, but not necessarily with the explosive's total energy (or work capacity), some of which may be released after passage of the detonation wave. A more brisant explosive, therefore, projects smaller fragments but not necessarily at a higher velocity than a less brisant one.

Notably brisant explosives
One of the most brisant of the conventional explosives is cyclotrimethylene trinitramine (also known as RDX or Hexogen). RDX is the explosive agent in the plastic explosive commonly known as C-4, constituting 91% RDX by mass.

See also
 Relative effectiveness factor
 Table of explosive detonation velocities

References

 A. Bailey & S.G. Murray, Explosives, Propellants & Pyrotechnics, Brassey's (UK) Ltd., London, 1989.

Explosives